Spuds MacKenzie is a fictional dog (bull terrier) character used for an extensive advertising campaign marketing Bud Light beer in the late 1980s. The Spuds MacKenzie mascot and campaign was the idea of a 23-year-old art director, Jon Moore. At the time, he was working at Needham, Harper, and Steers, a Chicago advertising agency. The dog first showed up in a Bud Light Super Bowl XXI ad in 1987.

The dog was portrayed by a female bull terrier named Honey Tree Evil Eye, or Evie for short (October 7, 1983 – May 31, 1993). Evie was from Woodstock, Illinois, and lived in North Riverside, Illinois, with her owner's family, where she later died of kidney failure in 1993. Anheuser-Busch sponsored many dogs from the kennel in Illinois where Evie was from.

The Spuds McKenzie ad campaign was not without its share of controversy. Shortly after Spuds' rise to fame, it was learned that the dog, portrayed as male in the ads, was actually female. The ads were criticized for promoting the consumption of alcohol by children by politicians and advocacy groups. Soon after the ads first aired in 1987, Senator Strom Thurmond began his own media campaign, claiming that the beer maker was using Spuds to appeal to children in order to get them interested in their product at an early age.  By Christmas 1987, more legal action resulted from Bud Light's use of ads featuring Spuds dressed as Santa, which is illegal in states such as Ohio.

In 1989, the Center for Science in the Public Interest, along with Mothers Against Drunk Driving, alleged that Anheuser-Busch was pitching the dog to children. Although the Federal Trade Commission found no evidence to support that allegation, Anheuser-Busch decided to retire Spuds in 1989, claiming that the character's image had started to overshadow the product.

In 2017, the character appeared in Bud Light's Super Bowl LI advertisement as a ghost who helps a man named Brian reunite with his friends, in an homage to Charles Dickens' A Christmas Carol. The house number in this advertisement's last segment is 1989, the year Spuds was retired.

Cultural references
 The character Slurms MacKenzie ("The Original Party Worm") from the television series Futurama is a parody of Spuds, as is Santa's Little Helper's stint as "Suds McDuff" on the episode "Old Yeller Belly" of The Simpsons.
 In his late-1980s anti-"sellout" anthem, "This Note's for You" (the title of which parodies Budweiser’s "This Bud's for You" ad campaign), Neil Young says he "ain't singing for Spuds" in the title track. The dog also appears throughout the music video for the song.
 The commercial's use of skinny females as a standard of beauty inspired Sir Mix-a-Lot to write "Baby Got Back" in retort.
 An issue of MAD Magazine in the late 1980s had a study of how cultural standards are going downhill, as one example, tracing how America's favorite dog went from Lassie to Benji to Spuds MacKenzie.
 A story arc in the comic strip Bloom County involved a drunken Spuds admitting her female gender to Opus and eventually checking into the Betty Ford Center, where she roomed with Mr. Ed.
 Appears in the Family Guy episodes "Brian Writes a Bestseller" and "A Fish Out of Water".
 Tone Lōc's song "Funky Cold Medina" lists Spuds McKenzie as one of the dogs trying to get into his house.
 George Clinton's song "Why should I dog U out" mentions Spud (Sic!) among other dogs.
 In The Golden Girls episode "Larceny and Old Lace", Sophia Petrillo is dating a man named Rocco (played by Mickey Rooney), whom she met in a police lineup. According to her daughter Dorothy Zbornak, Rocco was arrested for "spray-painting something obscene" on a billboard of Spuds MacKenzie. Sophia's response is that because "the dog they use in those ads is really a female, Rocco was just making Spuds anatomically correct".
 In the ALF episode "Baby Love", ALF suggests to name the baby Rin Tin Tanner, or Spuds if it is female.

See also 
 List of individual dogs

References

1980s television commercials
1983 animal births
1993 animal deaths
Advertising and marketing controversies
Advertising campaigns
American television commercials
Anheuser-Busch advertising
Beer advertising
Corporate mascots
Deaths from kidney failure
Dog mascots
Drink advertising characters
Individual dogs
Male characters in animation
Super Bowl commercials